The 2017–18 Alabama Crimson Tide women's basketball team represent the University of Alabama in the 2017–18 NCAA Division I women's basketball season. The Crimson Tide, led by fifth-year head coach Kristy Curry, play their games at Coleman Coliseum and were members of the Southeastern Conference. They finished the season 20–14, 7–9 in SEC play to finish in eighth place. They lost in the second round of the SEC women's tournament to Kentucky. They received an automatic bid to the Women's National Invitation Tournament defeat Southern, UCF and Georgia Tech in the first, second and third rounds before losing to Virginia Tech in the quarterfinals.

Roster

Schedule

|-
!colspan=9 style="background:#990000; color:#FFFFFF;"| Exhibition

|-
!colspan=9 style="background:#990000; color:#FFFFFF;"| Non-conference regular season

|-
!colspan=9 style="background:#990000; color:#FFFFFF;"| SEC regular season

|-
!colspan=9 style="background:#990000;" color:#FFFFFF;"| SEC Women's Tournament

|-
!colspan=12 style="text-align: center; background:#990000"|Women's National Invitation Tournament

Source:

Rankings
2017–18 NCAA Division I women's basketball rankings

See also
 2017–18 Alabama Crimson Tide men's basketball team

References

Alabama
Alabama Crimson Tide women's basketball seasons
Alabama
Alabama Crimson Tide
Alabama Crimson Tide